The 1996 NCAA Division III women's basketball tournament was the 15th annual tournament hosted by the NCAA to determine the national champion of Division III women's collegiate basketball in the United States.

Wisconsin–Oshkosh defeated Mount Union in the championship game, 66–50, to claim the Titans' first Division III national title. 

The championship rounds were hosted by the University of Wisconsin–Oshkosh in Oshkosh, Wisconsin.

Bracket

Final Four

All-tournament team
 Shelley Dietz, Wisconsin–Oshkosh
 Wendy Wangerin, Wisconsin–Oshkosh
 Suzy Venet, Mount Union
 Tracy Wilson, Mount Union
 Kirsten Vipond, St. Thomas (MN)

See also
 1996 NCAA Division III men's basketball tournament
 1996 NCAA Division I women's basketball tournament
 1996 NCAA Division II women's basketball tournament
 1996 NAIA Division I women's basketball tournament
 1996 NAIA Division II women's basketball tournament

References

 
NCAA Division III women's basketball tournament
1996 in sports in Wisconsin